Noua Dreaptă is an ultranationalist, far-right organization in Romania and Moldova, founded in 2000. The party claims to be the successor to the far-right Iron Guard, with its aesthetics and ideology being directly influenced by the fascist movement and its leader, Corneliu Zelea Codreanu. 

Proclaiming itself as "radical, militant, nationalist and Christian Orthodox", Noua Dreaptă supports a merger of Romania and Moldova.

Beliefs
The group's beliefs include militant ultranationalism and strong Orthodox Christian religious convictions. Noua Dreaptă's website indicates opposition to: sexual minorities, Roma (Gypsies), abortion, communism, globalization, the European Union, NATO, religious groups other than the Eastern Orthodox Church, race-mixing, territorial autonomy for Romania's ethnic Hungarian minority and immoderate cultural import (including some American culture, manele music, and the celebration of Valentine's Day).  They are against both Marxism and capitalism, following the third positionist ideology.

The members of Noua Dreaptă revere the leader of the Iron Guard in the 1930s, Corneliu Zelea Codreanu. Noua Dreaptă members refer to him as "Căpitanul" ("The Captain"), which is what Codreanu's supporters called him during his lifetime.

Goals and actions

The stated ultimate political aim of Noua Dreaptă is to restore Greater Romania, which represented Romania at its greatest geographic expanse before World War II. The group also states it is strongly opposed to the principles of representative democracy, which it sees as an "inadequate" form of government. Some individual members are monarchists.

Noua Dreaptă is registered as a political party since 2015. The number of members is undocumented, but it is estimated from 1000 to 2000.

Among other actions, the organization attempts to attract supporters through publicity campaigns aimed against foreign influence without any connections with the Romanian traditional heritage (and therefore considered negative) cultural influences - such as Valentine's Day.

Affiliations
Noua Dreaptă was part of the European National Front, an umbrella group of far-right nationalist organizations, many of which can be characterized as Fascist.  The Noua Dreaptă web site includes a column of "links of interest" to numerous extreme nationalist organizations throughout Europe, including the following:

 Danskernes Parti (Denmark)
 FE-La Falange (Spain)
 National Democratic Party of Germany (Germany)
 Forza Nuova (Italy)
 Patriotic Alliance (Greece)
 National Renovator Party (Portugal)
 Renouveau Français (France)
 Srpski Obraz (Serbia)
 Nationale Alliantie (The Netherlands)
 Slovenská Pospolitosť (Slovakia)
 Mișcarea Național Creștină Moldova (Moldova)
 Nation (Belgium)
 National Revival of Poland (Poland)
 Bulgarian National Alliance (Bulgaria)
 Fiamma Tricolore (Italy)
 Russkii Obraz (Russia)

Noua Dreaptă is also reported to have had ties with the following political groups:

 Eurasian Youth Union (Russia)
 England First
 Nacionālā Spēka Savienība (Latvia)
 Jednota Slovenskej Mládeže (Slovakia)

As of 30 May 2018, Noua Dreaptă is a member of the Alliance for Peace and Freedom. The AFP is a far-right and ultranationalist European political party that also includes Forza Nuova, National Democratic Party of Germany, Kotleba – People's Party Our Slovakia and National Democracy among others.

Extremist reputation

Noua Dreaptă uses imagery associated with legionarism, the ideology of the nationalist and anti-Semitic interwar Iron Guard, which roughly paralleled the Fascist and Nazi movements in Italy and Germany, respectively. The group's symbol, for example — the Celtic cross (usually drawn on a green background) — is reminiscent of the insignia of the Iron Guard. Due to its imagery's uses and its methods, the party is sometimes described as neo-Nazi by news outlets.

Noua Dreaptă has aligned itself with organizations elsewhere in Europe with strongly anti-Semitic views, although it has not focused its efforts against Romania's currently small Jewish community. Rather, the group has concentrated its rhetoric and efforts against the ethnic Hungarians, Roma (Gypsies), sexual minorities and minority religious faiths.

Its anti-democratic and anti-constitutional views and statements made them a permanent target of surveillance by the Directorate for the Defense of the Constitution, a department of the domestic intelligence service.

Political rallies
In May 2006, dozens of Noua Dreaptă members were detained by police after protesting the GayFest pride parade in Bucharest. Police also used tear gas to disperse counterprotesters led by individuals identified as Noua Dreaptă members.

On 15 March 2008, on the National Day of Hungary, Noua Dreaptă organized an anti-Hungarian rally in Cluj-Napoca — an action which, after group members attacked and beat an ethnic Hungarian celebrator, led UDMR leader Béla Markó to criticize Cluj's mayor Emil Boc for approving it. In addition, two ethnic Hungarian members of the Romanian Parliament demanded the banning of Noua Dreaptă on the grounds that it continues Iron Guard's spirit.

Electoral history

Legislative elections

Local elections

See also
Antiziganism
Iron Guard
European National Front

References

External links
Noua Dreaptă official site
Noua Dreapta Basarabia

2000 establishments in Romania
Anti-communism in Romania
Anti-Hungarian sentiment in Romania
Antisemitism in Romania
Antiziganism in Romania
Anti-Islam political parties in Europe
Far-right political parties in Romania
Fascist parties in Romania
Registered political parties in Romania
Political parties established in 2000
Racism in Romania
Romanian nationalist parties
Third Position
Nationalist parties in Romania
Organizations that oppose LGBT rights
Romanian irredentism
Anti-communist parties
Political parties with anti-Hungarian sentiment
Neo-fascist parties